Norma John is a Finnish duo consisting of pianist Lasse Piirainen and vocalist Leena Tirronen. Tirronen previously placed third on season one of X Factor Suomi. They represented Finland in the Eurovision Song Contest 2017, with the song "Blackbird" but failed to qualify to the final.

Discography

Singles

As featured artist

Television

References

External links

Finnish musical groups
Eurovision Song Contest entrants for Finland
Eurovision Song Contest entrants of 2017
Musical groups from Helsinki
Finnish musical duos
Male–female musical duos